Chat-Shire (stylized as CHAT-SHIRE) is the fourth Korean-language extended play by South Korean singer-songwriter IU. The self-composed EP was released digitally on October 23, 2015, and physically four days later by LOEN Entertainment under its imprint LOEN Tree. It was her first original material release since Modern Times (2013).

Chat-Shire contains seven tracks in total including the lead single "Twenty-Three". It also features two CD-only bonus tracks ("Heart" and "Twenty Three") from KBS's television series The Producers, in which IU starred as Cindy.

Composition
According to Scott Interrante of PopMatters, Chat-Shire uses lush orchestrations and complex arrangements that recreates a 90's chamber pop sound similar to The Cardigans.
The song "Red Queen" was inspired by a drawing created by Sulli.

Reception

Commercial reception
The lead single, "Twenty-Three", topped the national music charts upon release with several of the album's tracks also ranking in the top ten. The track eventually achieved a Perfect All-Kill, as the single hit Number 1 on all of the major South Korean music sites simultaneously. The album reached a peak position of number two on Gaon Album Chart and also reached number four on Billboards World Albums chart.

Critical reception

Billboard listed the album at number six on its list of "Top 10 Best K-Pop Albums of 2015" and described the album as a "must-hear" release, containing "some of [IU's] most personal music yet", and named "The Shower" as its stand-out track. Seoul Beats also highlighted the "personal quality" showcased in many of the album's tracks and praised IU's "growing maturity as an artist" and her willingness to experiment musically.

Plagiarism controversy
Following its release, the album was controversial for allegedly using Britney Spears' voice and sampling her 2007 song "Gimme More" without permission in the bonus track "23". Although she did not compose the music for the song, IU issued an apology for not checking the samples' sources as the album's producer.

The lyrics for "Zezé" and its illustration on the album cover were criticized by the Korean publisher of the novel My Sweet Orange Tree for its reinterpretation of its five-year-old protagonist, Zezé. Amidst growing debate in the music community, the book's publisher later apologized for its failure to acknowledge the "diversity of interpretation". The controversy surrounding "Zezé" attracted international attention with AbeBooks reporting My Sweet Orange Tree as the most searched for book on its site on November 5–6, despite the book being out of print in English for years. Meanwhile, South Korea's largest book store chain, Kyobo Book Centre, reported that sales of the book has increased 5.7 times over the period of November 5–8 when compared to sales over the November 1–4 period.

Track listing

Notes
 The title of track 1 literally means "New Shoes".
 The title of track 4 literally means "Once Blue".
 The title of track 7 literally means "Eyeglasses".

Charts

Release history

References

2015 EPs
IU (singer) EPs
Korean-language EPs
Kakao M EPs